Merhav Am (lit. Nation's Expanse) is a religious community settlement in southern Israel. Located in the Negev desert between Yeruham and the kibbutz of Sde Boker, it falls under the jurisdiction of Ramat HaNegev Regional Council.

History
Merhav Am was founded by the Or Movement on 1 November 2001 and had a population of around 30 families by November 2006, many living in caravans.

The original name was intended to be Halukim due to its proximity to the Halukim Hills (the nearest road junction is called the Halukim Junction). However, after around a year it was renamed Merhav Am, inspired by the wide open area in which it was to be built, as well as in honour of Rehavam Ze'evi, a former Minister who was assassinated in 2001: In Hebrew Merhav (מרחב - MRHV) means "wide open spaces" whilst Rehavam is spelt using the last three letters of the word plus two more (רחבעם - RHVAM). Combining the two gives Merhav Am (MRHV+AM).

References

External links
Official website 

Religious Israeli communities
Community settlements
Populated places in Southern District (Israel)
Populated places established in 2001
2001 establishments in Israel